Frederick Lee Ford (March 30, 1938 – May 22, 2021) was an American football halfback for the Buffalo Bills and Los Angeles Chargers of the American Football League. He played college football at Cal Poly for the Mustangs.

He died on May 22, 2021 at the age of 83.

Collegiate career 
Ford's top season at Cal Poly came in 1958, when he scored eight total touchdowns and led the squad in rushing, compiling 515 yards on 65 carries. Following the 1958 season, Ford was selected for Little All-America honorable mention.

Professional football 
For the 1960 Chargers, on December 18 against the New York Titans, Ford rushed for a career-high 109 yards and a touchdown on seven carries.

References

1938 births
Players of American football from Bakersfield, California
American football running backs
California Polytechnic State University alumni
Cal Poly Mustangs football players
Buffalo Bills players
Los Angeles Chargers players
American Football League players
2021 deaths